Sean Delaney may refer to:

 Sean Delaney (musician) (1945–2003), American musician, producer, and road manager
 Sean Delaney (sportsman) (1949–2004), Gaelic games sportsman from Ireland
 Sean Delaney (actor) (born 1994), from England